Jimmy Koitzsch, also known by his stage name Svidden (born 1984), is a Swedish record producer, songwriter and musician based in Stockholm. He began his career largely affiliated with the work of Style of Eye, who later went on to form the house music duo Galantis and producing most of their work.

Together with the duo, Svidden has written and produced multi-platinum selling hit singles like "Runaway (U & I)", "No Money", and "Peanut Butter Jelly".

Aside from the project, he has also collaborated with artists like Miike Snow, Hilary Duff, and Adam Lambert.

At the 58th Annual Grammy Awards in 2015, Svidden was nominated for a Grammy in the Best Dance recording category with the song "Runaway (U & I)".

In 2016 he, together with Galantis and Henrik Jonback, received SKAPs (Sweden composers and writers) award for "Producer of the year".

Discography

Singles

Featured appearances

Songwriting and production credits

Remixes

References

Living people
Swedish record producers
1984 births